Al-Maydān is an Egyptian independent weekly newspaper published in Arabic. The paper was first published on 16 March 1995. It is part of Al-Maydān, Inc. In 2001, its editor-in-chief, Mohammed Mohammed Al Mursy, was arrested and jailed for taking bribes from a producer to stop the defamation campaign against him published in the paper.

References

External links
 (archived)

1995 establishments in Egypt
Arabic-language newspapers
Newspapers established in 1995
Weekly newspapers published in Egypt